George's Creek is an unincorporated community in Allegany County, Maryland, United States.  It lies within Georges Creek Valley.

References

Unincorporated communities in Allegany County, Maryland
Unincorporated communities in Maryland